The following outline is provided as an overview and topical guide of the Republic of Artsakh and Nagorno-Karabakh region:

Nagorno-Karabakh is a disputed region in the South Caucasus region of Eurasia.

General reference 

 Pronunciation:
 Common English country name:  Nagorno-Karabakh
 Official English country names:  The Republic of Artsakh or (formerly and still commonly used, the Nagorno-Karabakh Republic)
 Common endonym(s):  
 Official endonym(s):  
 Adjectival(s):
 Demonym(s):
 Etymology: Name of Nagorno-Karabakh
 ISO country codes:  See the Outline of Azerbaijan
 ISO region codes:  See the Outline of Azerbaijan
 Internet country code top-level domain:  See the Outline of Azerbaijan

Geography of Artsakh 

 The Republic of Artsakh is: a de facto independent country, but it is officially part of the Republic of Azerbaijan
 Location:
 Eurasia
 Caucasus (between Europe and Asia)
 South Caucasus
 Time zone: Armenia Time, UTC+04:00
 Population of Artsakh: 
 Area of Artsakh: 4,400 km2
 Atlas of Nagorno-Karabakh

Environment of Artsakh 

 Climate of Nagorno-Karabakh
 Renewable energy in Nagorno-Karabakh
 Geology of Nagorno-Karabakh
 Protected areas of Nagorno-Karabakh
 Biosphere reserves in Nagorno-Karabakh
 National parks of Nagorno-Karabakh
 Wildlife of Nagorno-Karabakh
 Fauna of Nagorno-Karabakh
 Birds of Nagorno-Karabakh
 Mammals of Nagorno-Karabakh

Natural geographic features of Artsakh 

 Glaciers of Nagorno-Karabakh
 Islands of Nagorno-Karabakh
 Lakes of Nagorno-Karabakh
 Mountains of Nagorno-Karabakh
 Volcanoes in Nagorno-Karabakh
 Rivers of Nagorno-Karabakh
 Waterfalls of Nagorno-Karabakh
 Valleys of Nagorno-Karabakh
 World Heritage Sites in Nagorno-Karabakh: None

Regions of Artsakh

Ecoregions of Artsakh

Administrative divisions of Artsakh

Provinces of Artsakh

Municipalities of Artsakh 

 Capital of the Republic of Artsakh: Stepanakert
 List of cities and towns in Artsakh
 List of twin towns and sister cities in the Republic of Artsakh

Demography of Artsakh

Government and politics of Artsakh 

 Form of government: Unitary presidential republic
 Capital of Artsakh: Stepanakert
 Elections in Artsakh
 List of political parties in Artsakh

Branches of the government of Artsakh

Executive branch of the government of Artsakh 

 Head of state and Head of government: President of Artsakh, Arayik Harutyunyan

Legislative branch of the government of Artsakh 

 National Assembly  (unicameral)

Judicial branch of the government of Artsakh 

 Supreme Court of Nagorno-Karabakh

Foreign relations of Artsakh 

 Armenia-Artsakh relations
 List of representative offices of Artsakh
 Minister of Foreign Affairs
 Visa policy of Artsakh
 Visa requirements for Artsakh citizens
 Artsakh passport

International organization membership 
 Community for Democracy and Rights of Nations
 Confederation of Independent Football Associations

Law and order in Artsakh 

 Constitution of Nagorno-Karabakh
 Crime in Nagorno-Karabakh
 Human rights in Nagorno-Karabakh
 LGBT rights in Nagorno-Karabakh
 Freedom of religion in Nagorno-Karabakh
 Law enforcement in the Republic of Artsakh

Military of Artsakh 

 Command
 Commander-in-chief:
 Ministry of Defence of Nagorno-Karabakh
 Forces
 Artsakh Defense Army
 Air Force of Nagorno-Karabakh
 Special forces of Nagorno-Karabakh
 Military history of the Republic of Artsakh
 Military ranks of Nagorno-Karabakh
 Land mine situation in Nagorno-Karabakh

Local government in Artsakh

History of Artsakh 

 Military history of Nagorno-Karabakh
 Timeline of Artsakh history

Culture of Artsakh 

 Architecture of Nagorno-Karabakh
 Cuisine of Nagorno-Karabakh
 Festivals in Nagorno-Karabakh
 Languages of Nagorno-Karabakh
 Media in Nagorno-Karabakh
 List of newspapers in Artsakh
 National symbols of Nagorno-Karabakh
 Coat of arms of Nagorno-Karabakh
 Flag of Nagorno-Karabakh
 National anthem of Nagorno-Karabakh
 People of Nagorno-Karabakh
 Public holidays in Nagorno-Karabakh
 Records of Nagorno-Karabakh

 Religion in Artsakh
 Christianity in Nagorno-Karabakh
Armenian Apostolic Church
 Hinduism in Nagorno-Karabakh
 Islam in Nagorno-Karabakh
 Judaism in Nagorno-Karabakh
 Sikhism in Nagorno-Karabakh
 World Heritage Sites in Nagorno-Karabakh: None

Art in Artsakh 
 Art in Nagorno-Karabakh
 Cinema of Nagorno-Karabakh
 Literature of Nagorno-Karabakh
 Music of Nagorno-Karabakh
 Television in Nagorno-Karabakh
 Theatre in Nagorno-Karabakh

Sports in Artsakh 

 Football in Nagorno-Karabakh
 Nagorno-Karabakh at the Olympics

Economy and infrastructure of Artsakh 

 Economic rank, by nominal GDP (2007):
 Agriculture in Nagorno-Karabakh
 Banking in Nagorno-Karabakh
 National Bank of Nagorno-Karabakh
 Communications in Nagorno-Karabakh
 Internet in Nagorno-Karabakh
 Companies of Nagorno-Karabakh
Currency of Artsakh: Artsakh dram and Armenian dram
ISO 4217: n/a
 Energy in Nagorno-Karabakh
 Energy policy of Nagorno-Karabakh
 Oil industry in Nagorno-Karabakh
 Health care in Nagorno-Karabakh
 Mining in Nagorno-Karabakh
 Nagorno-Karabakh Stock Exchange
 Tourism in the Republic of Artsakh

 Transport in Nagorno-Karabakh
 Airports in Nagorno-Karabakh
 Rail transport in Nagorno-Karabakh
 Roads in Nagorno-Karabakh
 Water supply and sanitation in Nagorno-Karabakh

Education in Artsakh

See also 

Index of Artsakh-related articles
List of international rankings
List of Nagorno-Karabakh-related topics
Outline of Armenia
Outline of Europe
Outline of Azerbaijan
Outline of geography

References

External links 

 Non-partisan sources
 All UN Security Council resolutions on Nagorno-Karabakh, courtesy U.S. State department
 Article on the Dec. 10 Referendum from Russia Profile
 COE — "The conflict over the Nagorno-Karabakh region dealt with by the OSCE Minsk Conference" Report by rapporteur David Atkinson presented to Political Affairs Committee of the Parliamentary Assembly of the Council of Europe
 Conciliation Resources - Accord issue: The limits of leadership - Elites and societies in the Nagorny Karabakh peace process also key texts & agreements and chronology (in English & Russian)
 Independence of Kosovo and the Nagorno-Karabakh Issue
 Interview with Thomas De Waal
 Radio Free Europe / Radio Liberty. Nagorno-Karabakh: Timeline Of The Long Road To Peace
 Regions and territories: Nagorno-Karabakh from the BBC
 Resolution #1416 from the Parliamentary Assembly of the Council of Europe
 USIP — Nagorno-Karabakh Searching for a Solution: Key points, by Patricia Carley, Publication of the United States Institute of Peace (USIP)
 USIP — Sovereignty after Empire Self-Determination Movements in the Former Soviet Union. Case Studies: Nagorno-Karabakh. by Galina Starovoitova, Publication of the United States Institute of Peace (USIP)

 Armenian perspective
 "Azat Artsakh" Daily Newspaper in Nagorno-Karabakh
 NKR Office in Washington, DC
 Official site of the Nagorno-Karabakh government
 Official site of the Nagorno-Karabakh Republic Ministry of Foreign Affairs

 Azerbaijani perspective
 Artsakh.com
 Ministry of Foreign Affairs of Azerbaijan republic
 Karabakh.co.uk 
 Karabakh.org

Nagorno-Karabakh